AleAda is Linda's sixth studio album (fifteenth overall), released in Russia on October 16, 2006. AleAda was recorded in Cyprus along with Greek producer Stefanos Korkolis. The title, AleAda, was an amalgamation of Linda's mother's name, Alexandra, and Korkolis' mother's name, Ada.

Of the album, Linda said:
“AleAda is a word from Stefanos Korkolis' and my language. The album deals with people very close to us. Analogous to the name is the word "infinity" - the cardiogram of heart, which is always beating and always bears its message for each person. "AleAda" can be considered the catalyst that one aspires to achieve internal harmony within; one who knows what warmth, love, and a mother is.” 

The first single from AleAda was released in March 2006, and unveiled as "Ya ukradu". This song became the biggest radio single since "Begi" from AtakA.

Formats
 Russian Standard Release. The initial release of AleAda including two additional remix tracks.
 Russian Limited Edition.  A re-issue of the album repackaged in a slipcase and Digipak including a separate DVD containing three music videos and a photo gallery.
 Greek Release. A re-issue of the album for the Greek audience including revised song titles, Greek and English translations within the booklet, and three additional tracks performed with popular Greek band Goin' Through.

Track listing

Singles

References

2006 albums
Linda (singer) albums